William Orr (1766 – 14 October 1797) was an Irish revolutionary and member of the United Irishmen who was executed in 1797 in what was widely believed at the time to be "judicial murder" and whose memory led to the rallying cry “Remember Orr” during the 1798 rebellion.

Background
Little is known of his early life. Orr was born to a Presbyterian farming family and bleach-green proprietor, of Ferranshane (Farranshane) outside Antrim town. The family were in comfortable circumstances, and William Orr as a result received a good education. His popularity amongst his countrymen is also noted, particularly among the Northern Presbyterian patriots. He was to become active in the Irish Volunteers and then joined the United Irishmen.

Sometime in the mid-1790s, he contributed several articles to their newspaper, the Northern Star.

Arrest and trial
He was charged at Carrickfergus Courthouse with administering the United Irish Test to a soldier named Hugh Wheatly, an offence which had recently been deemed a capital charge under the 1796 Insurrection Act. The offence was aggravated (from a legal point of view) because of the allegation that it was a serving soldier whom Orr was alleged to have administered the oath to. The prosecution made the most of this "proof" of the "treasonable" aim of the United Irishmen to "seduce from their allegiance" the "men who are the Kingdom's only safeguard against the foreign foe".

The United Irishmen knew from the evidence of some of their own number that Orr had not administered the oath on the occasion alleged. They also had the evidence of another eye-witness, Jamie Hope. The soldier witness Wheatly perjured himself and it was proved he was of bad character. The person who did tender the oath was a well-known member of the Society, William McKeever, who subsequently escaped to America.

It was widely believed at the time that the authorities wished to make an example of Orr to act as a deterrent to potential recruits for the Society of United Irishmen. English engraver and radical George Cumberland, who was a friend of the poet William Blake, wrote in reaction to news of events in Ireland:

The actual case, which did not appear in the course of the proceedings but everyone, according to T. A. Jackson, was "in the know" and fully aware was that The United Irishmen's oath had been administered to a soldier; "whether it was Orr or another who administered the oath was merely incidental".

Defence
William Orr was represented by John Philpot Curran, and the trial led to a speech, which, according to T. A. Jackson, "is among the most remarkable of his many remarkable speeches."

It was a charge of libel against the Press newspaper, the journal founded by Arthur O'Connor to replace the Northern Star. The Press had published an open letter to the Viceroy, remarking scornfully on his refusal to show clemency to Orr. Curran's defence was a counter-attack—an indictment of the Government, root and branch:

Sentence
The only evidence used against Orr was the unsupported evidence of the soldier Wheatly and after hearing Curran's defence of the prisoner, "there could be no possible doubt of his innocence". Even the presiding judge, Yelverton, was said to have shed tears at the passing of the death sentence, although Orr's friend, the poet and United Irishman William Drennan expressed his disgust at this display with the words “I hate those Yelvertonian tears”.

Speech from the Dock

Legacy
The sentence was hardly passed on William Orr when regret was to seize on those who had aided in securing that verdict. The witness Wheatly, who subsequently went insane, is believed to have died by his own hand, made an affidavit before a magistrate admitting that he had sworn wrongly against Orr. Two of the jury made depositions stating that they had been "induced to join in the verdict of guilty while under the influence of drink"; while two others swore that they had "been terrified into the same course by threats of violence".

These particulars were placed before the Viceroy, but Lord Camden, the Lord Lieutenant of Ireland, was "deaf to all appeals" (including from his sister Lady Londonderry). "Well might Orr exclaim within his dungeon" he said "that the Government had laid down a system having for its object murder and devastation".

Orr was hanged, in the town of Carrickfergus though his execution was postponed three times on 14 October 1797, surrounded by an extra strong military guard. It is said that the population of the town, to express their sympathy with the "patriot" being "murdered by law", and to mark their repugnance of the conduct of the Government towards him, quit the town on the day of his execution.

His fate "excited the deepest indignation throughout the country”; and it was commented on "in words of fire" by the national writers of the period, and for many years after the rallying cry of the United Irishmen was: "Remember Orr". The journalist Peter Finnerty, who published an attack on Yelverton and Camden for their conduct in the matter, was later convicted of seditious libel, despite an eloquent defence by Curran.

Orr is regarded as the first United Irish martyr. Before his execution in July 1798, Henry Joy McCracken passed through his cell window a ring taken from his hand to his sister Mary Ann McCracken inscribed on the inside with the words, ‘Remember Orr’ on the inside. It had been the cry of the rebels he had commanded at the Battle of Antrim.

William Drennan the United Irishmen poet wrote, on Orr's death:
hapless land!Heap of uncementing sand!Crumbled by a foreign weight:And, by worse, domestic hate.

William Orr's place in Ulster folk history has been researched by the historian Guy Beiner, who considers it to be an example of "a complex mode of social memory that could be labelled 'social forgetting'".

References

1766 births
1797 deaths
United Irishmen
Ulster Scots people
Irish Presbyterians
Protestant Irish nationalists
People from Antrim, County Antrim